Fodderty  is a small hamlet, close to Dingwall, Ross-shire in the Scottish Highlands and is in the Scottish council area of Highland.

The small hamlet of Bottacks is located 1 mile to the west, and just to the east is Brae or Brea, formed in 1777 from the lands (long held by a branch of the Mackenzies) of Davochcarn, Davochmaluag and Davochpollo.  "Davochmaluag" is named after the famous missionary saint - St Moluag of Lismore (died AD592) - to whom the church at Fodderty was dedicated. Only a mound remains in the burial-ground to mark where this church stood.

Fodderty Cemetery also contains the burial place of Willie Logan (1913-1966) that is marked by a memorial in the shape of a pier of the Tay Road Bridge which, through his father's Muir of Ord-based building firm, he helped to construct.  He also founded the Scottish regional airline Loganair.

The growing town of Dingwall now encroaches on Fodderty.

See also
John M'Gilligen of Fodderty who held conventicles in houses throughout the county.

References

Populated places in Ross and Cromarty
Clan Mackenzie
Parishes in Ross and Cromarty